České Petrovice is a municipality and village in Ústí nad Orlicí District in the Pardubice Region of the Czech Republic. It has about 200 inhabitants.

Geography
České Petrovice is located in the Orlické Mountains. The municipality lies on the Czech-Polish border.

References

External links

Villages in Ústí nad Orlicí District